The 2012 BRD Brașov Challenger was a professional tennis tournament played on Clay courts. It was the 17th edition of the tournament which was part of the 2012 ATP Challenger Tour. It took place in Brașov, Romania between 3 and 9 September 2012.

Singles main draw entrants

Seeds

 1 Rankings are as of August 27, 2012.

Other entrants
The following players received wildcards into the singles main draw:
  Andrei Ciumac
  Victor Crivoi
  Petru-Alexandru Luncanu
  Florin Mergea

The following players received entry from the qualifying draw:
  Matteo Fago
  Marc Giner
  Hans Podlipnik
  Goran Tošić

Champions

Singles

 Andreas Haider-Maurer def.  Adrian Ungur, 3–6, 7–5, 6–2

Doubles

 Marius Copil /  Victor Crivoi def.  Andrei Ciumac /  Oleksandr Nedovyesov, 6–7(8–10), 6–4, [12–10]

External links

BRD Brasov Challenger
BRD Brașov Challenger
2012 in Romanian tennis
September 2012 sports events in Romania